Ksar Akil Flake is an oval type of Lithic flake with fine, regular teeth at frequent intervals. The flint tool is named after the archaeological site of Ksar Akil in Lebanon, where several examples were found and suggested to date to the late Upper Paleolithic. 

Other examples are held by the Archaeological Museum of the American University of Beirut, Lorraine Copeland and some are also likely to be among the Ksar Akil material held in London. Five other examples are held in the Museum of Lebanese Prehistory found at Borj Barajne in the Sands of Beirut along with two worn examples discovered at Antelias cave. Another Ksar Akil flake was found at El-Emireh.

References

Tools
Lithics
Paleolithic